White Tiger is a fictional animal superhero character appearing in American comic books published by Marvel Comics. The character has been depicted as a white Bengal tigress capable of mutating into a woman, that appeared in the series Heroes for Hire. She is the second character to use the identity of the White Tiger, the first being Hector Ayala.

Fictional character biography
When the High Evolutionary mutated a wolf into a powerful creature called the Man-Beast, his creation turned evil, and escaped. High Evolutionary created a second altered animal to catch his rogue wolf. He mutated a white Bengal tigress into a woman, whom he named the White Tiger. White Tiger's bestial origins gave her cat-like speed and reflexes, and she was highly skilled in martial arts. On her quest to find Man-Beast, White Tiger joined a team of villains called the U-Foes, and fell in love with their leader, Vector. When the U-Foes attacked a supervillain prison, White Tiger left the team, and searching for heroes to help her, found Iron Fist. She was intrigued by him, and joined his team Heroes for Hire. White Tiger tried to keep her origins a secret, but during a training session with Iron Fist, he defeated her several times in mock combat. Her anger overwhelmed her, and she lost control and reverted to her tiger form. She feared that the others would shun her for her animal-nature, but they accepted her as part of the team.

White Tiger found herself becoming attracted to Iron Fist, as she thought he was a "fine hunter", and was impressed with his skills and stealth. However, she learned that Iron Fist was in love with Misty Knight. White Tiger tried to chase Misty away from Iron Fist, even trying to attack Misty in her tiger form, in a show of dominance (like tigers do in the wild). When Misty told White Tiger that humans don't use dominance to fall in love, it broke White Tiger's heart. When White Tiger finally captured Man-Beast, she begged the High Evolutionary to turn her back into a tiger, to remove her humanity, as she couldn't deal with the pain of human emotions. He turned her back into a tiger, and promised to return her to the rainforests where he found her.

In the X-Men: Endangered Species storyline, it was revealed that the White Tiger had a sister who was altered into a humanoid white tiger called Snow Queen. When Snow Queen threatened to kill some explorers attempting to enter Wundagore, Beast says that White Tiger would have bitten off her own tongue before threatening unarmed innocents.

Powers and abilities
White Tiger is an expert martial artist who has cat-like speed and reflexes. Her gloves are equipped with razor-sharp claws. If angered, White Tiger can return to her tiger form, and in this form, she has deadly talons, superhuman strength, and enhanced senses. She can even assume a human/tiger hybrid form, becoming a weretiger.

In order for White Tiger to be able to confront and capture Man-Beast, High Evolutionary endowed her with resistance to psionic powers, making White Tiger immune to Man-Beast's mind-control ability.

References

External links
Her profile at the Appendix to the Marvel Handbook

Comics characters introduced in 1997
Marvel Comics characters who are shapeshifters
Marvel Comics characters with superhuman strength
Marvel Comics female superheroes
Marvel Comics superheroes
Fictional characters with superhuman senses
Fictional werecats
Marvel Comics martial artists
Fictional tigers
Characters created by Roger Stern
Transians
White Tiger (comics)